Associação Desportiva Recreativa e Cultural Icasa, or simply Icasa, is a Brazilian professional football club based in Juazeiro do Norte, Ceará. It competes in the Campeonato Cearense Série B, the second division of the Ceará state football league.

The club competed several times in the Campeonato Brasileiro Série C and returning after be relegated from Campeonato Brasileiro Série B in 2011.

History
The club was founded on May 1, 1963 by Doro Germano, and José Feijó de Sá, as Icasa Esporte Clube. The club's founders were the owners of Indústria Cearense de Algodão S.A (Ceará Cotton Industry), shortened as ICASA, hence the club's name.

Icasa competed in the Campeonato Brasileiro Série C in 1981, 1995 and in 1998, being eliminated in the first stage in 1981, in the second stage in 1995, and in the first stage in 1998. In 1985, Icasa competed in the Série B, where they were eliminated in the first stage. In 1992, Icasa won the Campeonato Cearense, sharing the title with Fortaleza, Ceará, and Tiradentes, as the competition was not concluded due to a judicial dispute.

In 1998, the club was founded again as Juazeiro Empreendimentos to avoid paying a labor debt for a former club's player. After the debt was paid with the help of the club's supporters, on January 7, 2002, Juazeiro was refounded as Associação Desportiva Recreativa Cultural Icasa. In 2003, the club won the Campeonato Cearense Second Level. Icasa competed again in the Série C in 2005, where they were eliminated in the second stage, in 2006, again Icasa was eliminated in the second stage, in 2007, the club was eliminated in the first stage. Icasa competed in the 2008 Série C, where they were eliminated in the second stage, but as one of the four best clubs eliminated in that stage, Icasa qualified to compete in the following season's Série C. In 2009, the club was promoted to Série B. They won the Copa Integração in 2007, 2008, and in 2009.

Stadium
The club usually plays its home games at Estádio Municipal Mauro Sampaio, usually known as Romeirão, which is a stadium located in Juazeiro do Norte, and it has a maximum capacity of 20,000 people.

Current squad
As of 29 December 2014

Honours

ADRC Icasa

Copa Integração:
Winners (3): 2007, 2008, 2009

Copa Fares Lopes:
Winners (2): 2014, 2021

Campeonato Cearense Série B
Winners (3):  2003, 2010, 2020

Head coaches
 Charles Fabian (2008)
 Freitas Nascimento (2011)
 Dado Cavalcanti (2011)
 Márcio Bittencourt (2011)
 Arnaldo Lira (2011)
 Tarcísio Pugliese (2012)
 José Carlos Serrão (2012)
 Francisco Diá (2012–2013)
 Sidney Moraes (2013)
 Roni Araújo (2014)
 Tarcísio Pugliese (2014)
 Leandro Sena (2014)
 Vladimir de Jesus (2014)
 Tarcísio Pugliese (2014–)

References

External links

 Associação Desportiva Recreativa Cultural Icasa official website

 
Association football clubs established in 1963
Football clubs in Ceará
1963 establishments in Brazil
Juazeiro do Norte